Hiraya FC, also known as Stallion–Hiraya FC due to partnership with Stallions,  is a Filipino women's football club that plays in the PFF Women's League, the top women's football league in the Philippines.

The club was founded by Philippine international player, Hanna Maiya Ibarra. They also participate in the 7's Football League and have won the women's division title in the fourth overall season.

2016 squad

Officials
As of 3 December 2016

References

External links

Women's football clubs in the Philippines
PFF Women's League clubs